Slomer is a village in Northern Bulgaria. It is situated in Pavlikeni Municipality, Veliko Tarnovo Province.

Geography
The village is located 15 km from Pavlikeni Municipality and about 40 km from Veliko Tarnovo Province. Slomer is adjacent to the village of Karaisen.

History
There is a stele honouring the people who have fought for the freedom of Bulgaria. It can be found in the centre of Slomer on a fountain which is not currently running.

Unfortunately, there is a school and kindergarten as well, closed and crumbling.

Religion and language
The population of the village consists of Christians. Spoken language – Bulgarian.

Public institutions
A health office, the building of the village hall and church with magnificent frescos.

Three grocery stores, one of which combined with a cafe. Two cafes, which also function as taverns.

Natural sights
The sites "Trite mogili" (Трите могили, The three mounds), "Slava mogila" (Слава могила, Slava mound), "Koriykata" (Корийката) and the Kosora forest with many trees and wolves around.

Regular events
A market is held every Friday selling various goods required by the villagers. An annual fair is held on the third Saturday of October.

References

Villages in Veliko Tarnovo Province